Yrjö Rafael Pulkkinen (1 April 1875 – 4 February 1945) was a Finnish lawyer and politician, who was born in Parkano. He was a member of the National Coalition Party. He served as Minister of Finance in Lauri Ingman's second cabinet (31 May 1924 – 31 March 1925), as Minister of Trade and Industry in Antti Tulenheimo's cabinet (31 March 1925 – 31 July 1925) and as a Member of Parliament (5 September 1922 – 31 July 1929).

References 

1875 births
1945 deaths
People from Parkano
People from Turku and Pori Province (Grand Duchy of Finland)
National Coalition Party politicians
Ministers of Finance of Finland
Ministers of Trade and Industry of Finland
Members of the Parliament of Finland (1922–24)
Members of the Parliament of Finland (1924–27)
Members of the Parliament of Finland (1927–29)
20th-century Finnish lawyers
University of Helsinki alumni
People of the Finnish Civil War (White side)